Parbatipur is a village within the jurisdiction of the Bishnupur police station in the Bishnupur I CD block in the Alipore Sadar subdivision of the South 24 Parganas district in the Indian state of West Bengal.

Geography

Demographics
As per 2011 Census of India, Parbatipur had a total population of 1,796.

Transport
Parbatipur is on the National Highway 12.

Healthcare
Chandi Doulatabad Block Primary Health Centre, with 10 beds, at Doulatabad (PO Nepalganj), is the major government medical facility in the Bishnupur I CD block.

References

Villages in South 24 Parganas district